Begtse ("Begtse the Great Coat of Mail") is a dharmapala and the lord of war in Tibetan Buddhism, originally a pre-Buddhist war god of the Mongols.

Name 
The name Begtse is a loanword from Mongolian , meaning "coat of mail". He is also given the name and epithet Jamsaran, meaning "Great Coat of Mail", which is a translation of the Mongolian.

Description 
Begtse has red skin and orange-red hair, two arms (as opposed to other Mahākālas, who have four or six), three blood-shot eyes and is wielding a sword in his right hand. He also holds a human heart in his right hand. In the stock of his right arm, he holds a bow and arrow and a halberd with bannet. He wears a chainmail shirt, which gave rise to his name, Jamsaran. He wears a Mongolian helmet with a crown of five skulls and four banners in the back. He is also accompanied by his consort, Rikpay Lhamo, and his main general, Laihansorgodog. They are surrounded by Jamsaran's satellites, the twenty-nine butchers.

Culture 
Jamsaran is represented in Mongolian, and to a lesser extent Tibetan, Cham dance.

See also 
 King Gesar, regarded an incarnation of Jamsaran
 Roman von Ungern-Sternberg, called an incarnation of Jamsaran by his followers
Beg tse, a ceratopsian dinosaur named after the deity

References

Bibliography

External links 
 Himalayan Art Resources.
 https://web.archive.org/web/20131101134355/http://www.thangka.ru/gallery/ge_jamsaran.html

Dharmapalas
War gods
Buddhist deities
Mongolian deities